Yves Miéville (born 12 December 1983 in Geneva) is a Swiss football player. He started his career with his local team Servette FC making his debut during the 2000–01 season. In 2004, he moved to FC Schaffhausen where he spent one season before moving onto FC Meyrin. Halfway through the season, in 2006, he moved to FC Lausanne-Sport.
And after FC Stade Nyonnais and Étoile Carouge FC
Miéville is a powerful centre back but has also been used as a target man on occasion to help out due to injuries to other players. He played for the national team with the young team.

References

External links
 Stade Nyonnais profile 
 Soccerway

1983 births
Living people
Swiss men's footballers
Servette FC players
FC Schaffhausen players
Association football defenders
Footballers from Geneva
FC Stade Nyonnais players
FC Meyrin players
People from Fribourg